Fredmund Sandvik (born 6 August 1951) is a Norwegian farmers' leader and politician for the Centre Party.

He hails from Laksøybygda in Meldal, and is a dairy farmer. He was the chair of Tine Midt-Norge from 1998, board member of the nationwide dairy cooperative Tine from 2002 and chair from 2006. Sandvik has also been a board member of the Norwegian Agrarian Association, and a member of Meldal municipal council for twelve years and Sør-Trøndelag county council for twelve years.

He stepped down as chair of Tine in 2010, citing high blood pressure as the reason. In 2010 he also stepped down as chair of Norsk Landbrukssamvirke. In 2011 he was voted as leader of the election committee in the Norwegian Agrarian Association.

References

1951 births
Living people
People from Meldal
Norwegian farmers
Norwegian chairpersons of corporations
Centre Party (Norway) politicians
Sør-Trøndelag politicians